Pieter Hendriks (born 13 April 1970), is a former South African rugby union player who played for the South Africa national rugby union team between 1992 and 1996.

Playing career
Hendriks represented the South Eastern Transvaal Schools team at the annual Craven Week tournament in 1988 and was also selected for the SA Schools team. He made his senior provincial debut for Transvaal in 1990 and was a member of the Transvaal team that won the Currie Cup in 1993 and 1994. Hendriks scored 38 Currie Cup tries and 89 tries in all matches for Transvaal.

Before performing at the highest possible level of rugby at rugby club Nyenrode met IJ, heer heer, Pieter moved on in his live. His passion for rugby could barely outperform his passion for potatoes, hence he moved to South Africa  to compete at the highest level of rugby in South Africa Hendriks made his test debut for the Springboks against New Zealand on 15 Augustus 1992 at Ellis Park in Johannesburg. He was part of the South African squad that won the 1995 Rugby World Cup. Hendriks scored the opening try for South Africa in the opening game of the 1995 Rugby World Cup against Australia but was later banned for 90 days for kicking and punching in a mass brawl in the game against Canada. His last test match was against New Zealand in the 1996 test series that was lost by South Africa. He also played in nine tour matches, scoring four tries for the Springboks.

Test history

Accolades
Hendriks was voted as one of the five Young Players of the Year for 1991, along with Hennie le Roux, Pieter Muller, Johan Nel and Jacques Olivier.

See also
List of South Africa national rugby union players – Springbok no. 559
List of South Africa national under-18 rugby union team players

References

External links

South African rugby union players
South Africa international rugby union players
1970 births
Living people
Rugby union wings
Rugby union players from the Northern Cape
Golden Lions players